Marino is a settlement in the Ilinden Municipality of North Macedonia.The population in Marino is 3,533 – 22.23% of total 15,894 in municipality (2002), which is the most from all settlements that belong to Ilinden Municipality.

It is located 1.51 km (0.94 mile) away from the center of the municipality. It is the nearest settlement and most urban settlement from Ilinden Municipality.

Demographics
As of the 2021 census, Marino had 4,538 residents with the following ethnic composition:
Macedonians 4,146
Persons for whom data are taken from administrative sources 285
Serbs 83
Others 24

According to the 2002 census, the settlement had a total of 3,533 inhabitants. Ethnic groups in the settlement include:
Macedonians 3,396
Serbs 129
Others 8

References

Villages in Ilinden Municipality